Harold Emil ("Bud") Rorschach Jr. (1926–1993) was an American physicist. Born in Tulsa, Oklahoma. He joined the faculty of Rice University in 1952, and served there throughout his career. He was three times the chairman of the physics department and was principal investigator of the NASA interdisciplinary laboratory at Rice, which conducted research involving a wide range of studies on solid materials.

Rorschach was born November 25, 1926 in Tulsa, Oklahoma to Harold E. Rorschach Sr. and his wife. He died as a result of a stroke on June 5, 1993 in Philadelphia, Pennsylvania, where he was visiting relatives.

Harold attended the University of Pennsylvania, where he earned his Bachelor of Science and Master of Science degrees. He then entered the Massachusetts Institute of Technology, where he earned the Doctor of Philosophy degree in Physics in 1951. In 1952, he joined the faculty of Rice University (then named the Rice Institute) in Houston, Texas as a physics professor. In 1963, he was awarded a Brown Prize for Teaching Excellence.

After Rorschach's death, his widow established the Dr. Harold E. Rorschach, Jr. Endowed Undergraduate Research Award in Physics.

Notes

References

1926 births
1993 deaths
20th-century American physicists
People from Tulsa, Oklahoma
People from Houston
University of Pennsylvania alumni
MIT Department of Physics alumni
Rice University faculty